Louis Adrien Potheau (August 14, 1870 – February 18, 1955) was a French sailor.  He won the Bronze medal in the 6m class in the 1908 Summer Olympics in London along with Henri Arthus and Pierre Rabot.

References

1870 births
1955 deaths
French male sailors (sport)
Sailors at the 1908 Summer Olympics – 6 Metre
Olympic sailors of France
Olympic bronze medalists for France
Olympic medalists in sailing
Medalists at the 1908 Summer Olympics